The 2019 Wimbledon Championships are described below in detail, in the form of day-by-day summaries.

All dates are BST (UTC+1).

Day 1 (1 July) 

Seeds out:
Gentlemen's Singles:  Alexander Zverev [6],  Stefanos Tsitsipas [7],  Gaël Monfils [16],  Dušan Lajović [32]
Ladies' Singles:  Naomi Osaka [2],  Aryna Sabalenka [10],  Markéta Vondroušová [14],  Caroline Garcia [23],  Daria Kasatkina [29]
Schedule of play

Day 2 (2 July) 

Seeds out:
Gentlemen's Singles:  Dominic Thiem [5],  Denis Shapovalov [29]
Ladies' Singles:  Donna Vekić [22],  Garbiñe Muguruza [26],  Lesia Tsurenko [32]
Schedule of play

Day 3 (3 July) 

Seeds out:
Gentlemen's Singles:  Stan Wawrinka [22],  Kyle Edmund [30]
Ladies' Singles:  Anastasija Sevastova [12],  Madison Keys [17],  Sofia Kenin [27]
Gentlemen's Doubles:  Kevin Krawietz /  Andreas Mies [13],  Dominic Inglot /  Austin Krajicek [15]
Schedule of play

Day 4 (4 July) 

Seeds out:
Gentlemen's Singles:  John Isner [9],  Marin Čilić [13],  Nikoloz Basilashvili [18],  Gilles Simon [20],  Alex de Minaur [25],  Laslo Đere [31]
Ladies' Singles:  Angelique Kerber [5],  Amanda Anisimova [25]
Ladies' Doubles:  Lucie Hradecká /  Andreja Klepač [11],  Veronika Kudermetova /  Jeļena Ostapenko [14]
Schedule of play

Day 5 (5 July) 

Seeds out:
Gentlemen's Singles:  Kevin Anderson [4],  Karen Khachanov [10],  Daniil Medvedev [11],  Félix Auger-Aliassime [19]
Ladies' Singles:  Caroline Wozniacki [14],  Anett Kontaveit [20],  Hsieh Su-wei [28],  Maria Sakkari [31]
Gentlemen's Doubles:  Mate Pavić /  Bruno Soares [4],  Jamie Murray /  Neal Skupski [10]
Ladies' Doubles:  Kirsten Flipkens /  Johanna Larsson [12]
Schedule of play

Day 6 (6 July) 

Seeds out:
Gentlemen's Singles:  Fabio Fognini [12],  Diego Schwartzman [24],  Lucas Pouille [27],  Jan-Lennard Struff [33]
Ladies' Singles:  Kiki Bertens [4],  Sloane Stephens [9],  Belinda Bencic [13],  Wang Qiang [15],  Julia Görges [18]
Gentlemen's Doubles:  Oliver Marach /  Jürgen Melzer [14]
Ladies' Doubles:  Samantha Stosur /  Zhang Shuai [5],  Raquel Atawo /  Lyudmyla Kichenok [16]
Mixed Doubles:  Jean-Julien Rojer /  Demi Schuurs [2],  Neal Skupski /  Chan Hao-ching [9],  Rohan Bopanna /  Aryna Sabalenka [13],  Divij Sharan /  Duan Yingying [16]
Schedule of play

Middle Sunday (7 July) 
As is tradition, Middle Sunday is a day of rest and no matches are played.

Day 7 (8 July) 

Seeds out:
Gentlemen's Singles:  Milos Raonic [15],  Matteo Berrettini [17],  Benoît Paire [28]
Ladies' Singles:  Ashleigh Barty [1],  Karolína Plíšková [3],  Petra Kvitová [6],  Elise Mertens [21],  Petra Martić [24],  Carla Suárez Navarro [30]
Gentlemen's Doubles:  Nikola Mektić /  Franko Škugor [6],  Bob Bryan /  Mike Bryan [7],  Máximo González /  Horacio Zeballos [9],  Robin Haase /  Frederik Nielsen [16]
Ladies' Doubles:  Victoria Azarenka /  Ashleigh Barty [10],  Duan Yingying /  Zheng Saisai [13]
Mixed Doubles:  Máximo González /  Xu Yifan [7],  Michael Venus /  Katarina Srebotnik [10]
Schedule of play

Day 8 (9 July) 

Seeds out:
Ladies' Singles:  Johanna Konta [19]
Gentlemen's Doubles:  Łukasz Kubot /  Marcelo Melo [1],  Jean-Julien Rojer /  Horia Tecău [5],  Rajeev Ram /  Joe Salisbury [12]
Ladies' Doubles:  Nicole Melichar /  Květa Peschke [7],  Chan Hao-ching /  Latisha Chan [9],  Irina-Camelia Begu /  Monica Niculescu [15]
Mixed Doubles:  Nikola Mektić /  Alicja Rosolska [6],  Fabrice Martin /  Raquel Atawo [14]
Schedule of play

Day 9 (10 July) 

Seeds out:
Gentlemen's Singles:  Kei Nishikori [8],  David Goffin [21],  Guido Pella [26]
Gentlemen's Doubles:  Henri Kontinen /  John Peers [8]
Ladies' Doubles:  Elise Mertens /  Aryna Sabalenka [6],  Anna-Lena Grönefeld /  Demi Schuurs [8]
Mixed Doubles:  Mate Pavić /  Gabriela Dabrowski [3],  John Peers /  Zhang Shuai [4],  Édouard Roger-Vasselin /  Andreja Klepač [11]
Schedule of play

Day 10 (11 July) 

Seeds out:
Ladies' Singles:  Elina Svitolina [8]
Gentlemen's Doubles:  Raven Klaasen /  Michael Venus [3]
Mixed Doubles:  Bruno Soares /  Nicole Melichar [1],  Franko Škugor /  Raluca Olaru [12]
Schedule of play

Day 11 (12 July) 

Seeds out:
Gentlemen's Singles:  Rafael Nadal [3],  Roberto Bautista Agut [23]
Ladies' Doubles:  Tímea Babos /  Kristina Mladenovic [1],  Barbora Krejčíková /  Kateřina Siniaková [2]
Mixed Doubles:  Wesley Koolhof /  Květa Peschke [5]
Schedule of play

Day 12 (13 July) 

Seeds out:
Ladies' Singles:  Serena Williams [11] 
Gentlemen's Doubles:  Nicolas Mahut /  Édouard Roger-Vasselin [11]
Schedule of play

Day 13 (14 July) 

Seeds out:
Gentlemen's Singles:  Roger Federer [2]
Ladies' Doubles:  Gabriela Dabrowski /  Xu Yifan [4]
Schedule of play

References

2019 Wimbledon Championships
Wimbledon Championships by year – Day-by-day summaries